The  was a class of four destroyers built for the Imperial Japanese Navy during World War I.

Background
The Isokaze-class destroyers were designed as part of the first phase of the Hachi-hachi Kantai program of the Imperial Japanese Navy.

Four vessels were built, with the order split between Kure Naval Arsenal, Kawasaki Shipyards in Kobe and Mitsubishi Shipyards in Nagasaki.

Design
The Isokaze-class ships were a slightly larger and updated version of the previous . Externally, the design went to a three smokestack profile, with a curved, rather than straight bow.

Internally, the engines were replaced with heavy fuel oil-fired steam turbine engines. Two vessels (Amatsukaze and Tokitsukaze) used Brown-Curtis turbine engines, and the other two (Isokaze, Hamakaze) used Parsons turbine engines. Advances in turbine design and construction permitted more reliable operation than previously with the Umikaze.

Armament was increased over the previous classes, with four QF 4.7 inch Gun Mk I - IV, pedestal-mounted along the centerline of the vessel, two in front of the smokestacks and two to the stern. The number of torpedoes was increased to three launchers, each with a pair of 533 mm torpedoes. Anti-aircraft protection was provided by four machine guns.

Operational history
The Isokaze-class destroyers were completed in time to serve in the very final stages of World War I. Tokitsukaze broke in two and sank off of Miyazaki Prefecture, Kyūshū in 1918. The wreck was raised and repaired at the Maizuru Naval Arsenal, and although re-commissioned as a first class destroyer, was used thereafter as a training vessel at the Imperial Japanese Navy Academy at Etajima.

All Isokaze-class ships were retired on 1 April 1935.

Ships

References

Notes

Books

Destroyer classes